Juncus continuus is a plant found in many parts of Australia. Often growing on sandy, moist soils, near fresh water. The specific epithet refers to the continuous pith within the stems. Basal leaves are reduced to sheaths, coloured yellow/green.

References

continuus
Flora of New South Wales
Flora of South Australia
Flora of Victoria (Australia)
Flora of Tasmania
Angiosperms of Western Australia
Flora of the Northern Territory
Poales of Australia